Amy Lindsay is an American actress and former softcore pornographic film performer.

Lindsay has had guest television appearances as Lana in the Star Trek: Voyager episode "Endgame", in Silk Stalkings, and as Sherry Drake on Pacific Blue.

In 2016, BuzzFeed reported that Lindsay had appeared in an advertisement for the 2016 presidential campaign for Ted Cruz. Lindsay told BuzzFeed that she is a Christian conservative and a Republican, deciding between supporting Ted Cruz or Donald Trump. The Cruz campaign said that it was unaware of "her full filmography" and pulled the ad soon after the report.

Filmography
 1994 The House on Todville Road
 1995 Exploding Angel
 1997 Confessions of a Lap Dancer
 1998 The Secrets of a Chambermaid
 1998 Forbidden Sins
 1998 Femalien II
 1998 Confessions of a Call Girl
 1999 Timegate: Tales of the Saddle Tramps
 2000 Tales of The Kama Sutra : The Perfumed Garden
 2001 Star Trek: Voyager (TV) Episode End Game Part 1
 2003 Final Examination
 2003 Descendant
 2003 Exposed
 2003 Bikini Airways
 2004 Black Tie Nights (TV)
 2008 Dog Tags
 2010 MILF

References

External links
 
 

American film actresses
20th-century American actresses
21st-century American actresses
Living people
Actresses from Columbus, Ohio
Actresses from Houston
American television actresses
Ohio Republicans
Texas Republicans
1966 births